Egge is a village in Gran Municipality in Innlandet county, Norway.

References

Gran, Norway
Villages in Innlandet